Słobity  is a village in the administrative district of Gmina Wilczęta, within Braniewo County, Warmian-Masurian Voivodeship, in northern Poland.

The village has been the property of the  since 1527.

The village has a population of 549.

Notable residents
 Alexander zu Dohna-Schlobitten (1661–1728), field marshal
 Friedrich Alexander Burggraf und Graf zu Dohna-Schlobitten (1741–1810)
 Friedrich Ferdinand Alexander zu Dohna-Schlobitten (1771–1831), Prussian politician
 Karl Friedrich Emil zu Dohna-Schlobitten (1784–1859), field marshal
 Richard zu Dohna-Schlobitten (1843–1916), counsellor of Kaiser Wilhelm II
 Heinrich Graf zu Dohna-Schlobitten (1882–1944), General and Resistance fighter
 Alexander zu Dohna-Schlobitten (1899–1997), Officer and businessman

References

External links

 http://slobity.com.pl

Villages in Braniewo County